Live in Anaheim is a double live album from Ian Gillan, recorded live at the House of Blues, Anaheim, California on 14 September 2006 during the Gillan's Inn tour and released in February 2008 by Edel Music. The accompanying DVD of the concert was released in July 2008.

In 2009 it was released as a CD/DVD release, in a slimline jewel-case. Only one CD was included, so three tracks were dropped for timing purposes, being 'Rivers Of Chocolate', 'Texas State Of Mind', and 'Drum solo'. The DVD was still the full show.

Track listing

CD one
 "Second Sight" (Towns)
 "No Laughing in Heaven" (Gillan, McCoy, Torme, Towns, Underwood)
 "Into The Fire" (Blackmore, Gillan, Glover, Lord, Paice)
 "Hang Me Out To Dry" (Gillan, Morris, West)
 "Have Love Will Travel" (Richard Berry)
 "Wasted Sunsets" (Blackmore, Gillan, Glover)
 "Not Responsible" (Blackmore, Gillan, Glover)
 "No Worries" (Gillan, Jackson)
 "Rivers of Chocolate" (aka "The G Jam") (Jackson)
 "Unchain Your Brain" (Gillan, McCoy, Torme)

CD two
 "Bluesy Blue Sea" (Gillan, Gers)
 "Moonshine" (Gillan, Morris, Buckle)
 "Texas State of Mind" (Jackson)
 "Sugar Plum" (Bloomfield, Gillan, Haze, Howard)
 "When A Blind Man Cries" (Blackmore, Gillan, Glover, Lord, Paice)
 "Men of War" (Gillan, McCoy)
 "Drum Solo"
 "Smoke on the Water" (Blackmore, Gillan, Glover, Lord, Paice)
 "Trouble" (Jerry Leiber, Mike Stoller)
 "Knocking at Your Back Door" (Blackmore, Gillan, Glover)

Production notes
Produced, mixed and mastered by Nick Blagona
Mixed at Psychotropic Studios, Dundas, Ontario Canada
Mastered at Metalworks Studios, Mississauga, Ontario, Canada
Audio recording by Westwood One on 14 September 2006 at the House of Blues, Anaheim, California
Executive producers: Drew Thompson and Michael Lee Jackson

Personnel
Ian Gillan - vocals, harmonica
Michael Lee Jackson - guitar
Dean Howard - guitar
Rodney Appleby - bass guitar, backing vocals
Randy Cooke - drums
Joe Mennonna - keyboards, saxophone, background vocals

Special guest
 Michael Bradford - guitar (CD1 – 9, CD2 – 8–10)

References

External links 
 Ian Gillan Official Website

Ian Gillan albums
Albums recorded at the House of Blues
2008 live albums
Edel Music albums
Albums produced by Nick Blagona